Pier 1 Imports, Inc. is an online retailer and former Fort Worth, Texas-based retail chain specializing in imported home furnishings and decor, particularly furniture, table-top items, decorative accessories, and seasonal decor. It was publicly traded on the New York Stock Exchange under ticker PIR. In January 2020, Pier 1 had over 1,000 physical stores throughout the United States and Canada. Pier 1 filed for Chapter 11 bankruptcy protection on February 17, 2020, and on May 19, 2020, announced it was asking the bankruptcy court to close all stores, due in large part to the COVID-19 pandemic.

In July 2020, Retail ECommerce Ventures (REV) bought the rights to Pier 1 and planned to revive the brand as an ecommerce store.

At the end of October 2020, Pier 1 Imports closed its remaining stores and transferred its website to REV, which is doing business as Dallas-based Pier 1 Imports Online, Inc.

History 
The first Pier 1 Imports store opened in 1962 in San Mateo, California under the name Cost Plus Imports.

Charles Tandy and Luther Henderson, the founders of Pier 1 Imports, were mainly involved with Radio Shack based in Fort Worth, Tx. By 1966, the company had grown to 16 store locations, and established the new corporate headquarters in Fort Worth, Texas.

Pier 1 went public on the American Stock Exchange in 1970 and later joined the New York Stock Exchange in 1972. At this time, the company had grown to 123 stores, posted 100 percent sales gains for four consecutive years, and opened stores internationally in Australia and Europe. A Pier 1 store in Royal Oak, Michigan reached annual sales of $1 million in 1979. By 1985, the Pier 1 chain grew to 265 stores, with the management goal of doubling that number by 1990.

Pier 1 had a presence in the Greater Tokyo Area of Japan, from April 1996 to early 2002, and its franchised stores were operated by Akatsuki Printing Co. There were 5 stores by early 1997, 16 by fiscal 1998, and 18 by fiscal 1999, but that number shrunk to just 9 by early 2000.

On December 29, 2006, Standard & Poor's bumped Pier 1 Imports Inc. down one spot and off the bottom of the S&P MidCap 400 Index when it added Parametric Technology Corp., a software company. As of December 2012, the company had sales of $418 million.

In April 2008, Chesapeake Energy bought the headquarters of Pier 1 for $104 million.

In May 2017, Alasdair James became CEO following Alex Smith's departure in December 2016. In December 2018, Alasdair James was replaced by veteran CEO Cheryl Bachelder. Bachelder is served as interim CEO until the former Pier 1 CFO, Robert Riesbeck took over in November 2019.

On January 6, 2020, it was announced that Pier 1 will close up to 450 stores, citing "a reduction in corporate headcount".

On February 17, 2020, Pier 1 Imports, Inc. and seven affiliated companies filed Chapter 11 bankruptcy in the United States District Court for the Eastern District of Virginia.  As part of the filing, the company is closing all their stores in Canada.

On May 19, 2020, Pier 1 Imports announced that it is asking the bankruptcy court to close all stores, due in large part to the COVID-19 pandemic and failing to find a buyer. On May 30, it was announced that Pier 1 Imports had received court approval to liquidate all locations. Pier 1 announced that they plan to close all stores by the end of October 2020.

In June 2020, Retail Ecommerce Ventures (REV) acquired Pier 1 for $31 million. REV, which was founded by former NASA scientist Alex Mehr and serial entrepreneur Tai Lopez, is a holding company that buys distressed iconic brands and revives them as e-commerce businesses. Other recent acquisitions of REV include DressBarn and Modell's Sporting Goods. REV acquired control of the Pier 1 website at the end of October 2020, just about the time the last store had closed, and moved on-line operations to Dallas.

On March 2, 2023, Retail Ecommerce Ventures, Pier 1 Imports' current parent, announced that it was mulling a possible bankruptcy filing.

Financial data 
Numbers given in millions USD.

Stores 

On April 17, 2019, Pier 1 announced plans to close up to 145 stores in its 2020 fiscal year ending in March. The company had already closed 30 locations in its 2019 fiscal year. As of April 2019, the chain operates 973 stores under the name Pier 1 Imports in the United States and Canada (with about 59 locations).

On January 6, 2020, Pier 1 announced that it planned to close up to 400 locations and several distribution centers to reduce its corporate expenses. The company said it has contracted a liquidation company to close the stores. In February 2020, Pier 1 updated this number, and announced it would close 450 locations in its Chapter 11 restructuring, which would include the closure of all Canadian locations. The company also had a children's furniture and accessories retail concept in the United States called Pier 1 Kids which was disbanded in September 2007. It was a member of the S&P MidCap 400 list through the end of 2006, when it was bumped off the list.

Pier 1 Imports also owned a chain of home-decor retailers in the United Kingdom called "The Pier" until it was sold to Palli Limited, a subsidiary of the Iceland-based Lagerinn ehf in March 2006 for approximately $15 million. This chain went into Administration in December 2008 and was finally closed in January 2009.

On May 19, 2020, the company announced it was asking the bankruptcy court to cease its retail operations "as soon as reasonably possible", blaming the drastic decision on closures caused by COVID-19 and failing to find a buyer. The company stated that orders placed on its website will continue to be fulfilled, and that it plans to sell its remaining inventory, website and intellectual property.

Merchandise

Pier 1 merchandise consists of home furnishings and items including accessories such as candles, vases, and picture frames as well as full-sized upholstered furniture, hand-carved armoires, large-scale vases and eclectic wall décor. Items are imported, created in conjunction with foreign designers, or produced by Pier 1's Trend and Product Development team.

Partnerships 
Pier 1 became a corporate partner of the U.S. Fund for UNICEF since 1985, its longest-running corporate partnership. As of 2013, this partnership had generated more than $42 million by selling UNICEF greeting cards, cause marketing, and emergency relief for Afghanistan, Haiti, and Iraq, as well as areas affected by the Indian Ocean tsunami.

Former spokespeople for the company, seen largely in broadcast commercials, include Cheers alumna Kirstie Alley and Thom Filicia of Queer Eye for the Straight Guy.

Gallery

See also
 The Akron

Notes

References

External links 
 

1962 establishments in California
1970s initial public offerings
Companies based in Fort Worth, Texas
Companies formerly listed on the New York Stock Exchange
Furniture retailers of the United States
Home decor retailers
American companies established in 1962
Retail companies established in 1962
Companies that filed for Chapter 11 bankruptcy in 2020
American companies disestablished in 2020
Companies disestablished due to the COVID-19 pandemic
Retail companies disestablished in 2020